Shantilal may refer to

Shantilal C. Sheth, Indian pediatrician
 Shantilal Mukherjee, Indian actor
Shantilal Soni, Film director
 Shantilal O Projapoti Rohoshyo, Bengali film
Shantilal Patel, Indian politician
Shantilal Shah Engineering College, located in Bhavnagar
Mohit Shantilal Shah, Former Chief Justice of the Bombay High Court 
Shantilal Kothari, Indian politician
Shantilal Jamnadas Mehta, Indian surgeon
Shantilal Bhagat, Director of Eco-Justice Concerns for the Church of the Brethren
Shantilal Shah, Indian politician